The Wood Bay Series is a geologic formation found on the island of Spitsbergen, Svalbard in Norway. It preserves fossils dating back to the Pragian–Emsian stages of the Devonian period.

See also

 List of fossiliferous stratigraphic units in Norway

References

 

Geologic formations of Norway
Devonian System of Europe
Devonian Norway